Ophyx maculosus is a moth of the family Erebidae. It is found on New Caledonia.

References

Ophyx
Moths described in 1979
Moths of Oceania